Brigadier General Estanislao López Stadium, popularly known as The Elephants Cemetery, is a football stadium in Santa Fe, Argentina. It was inaugurated in 1946 and is owned and operated by Club Atlético Colón, which is based there.

For a long time it has also been known as the Elephants Cemetery, due to Colón's wins over notable teams that visited Santa Fe. One of them was the famous Santos of Pelé who fell 2-1 in 1964. This Brazilian team had a record of 43 undefeated matches and was two-time Intercontinental champion at that time. The same Colón team later beat the Argentine team itself 2-0. Other teams that were defeated there were Peñarol in 1967, Millonarios, Olimpia, U de Chile, Alianza Lima, Atlético Mineiro, among others.

It currently has the capacity to hold 46,000 spectators, of which 28,500 are box seats or stalls and 16,500 are popular only, and the dimensions of the playing field are 105 x 70 m. It is entirely surrounded by concrete grandstands, including an upper tray on the north, east, and south sides, plus outfitted boxes on the northwest and southwest elbows.

The Argentina national football and rugby teams played some friendly and test matches at Estadio Brigadier López. It was also one of the venues of the 2011 Copa América.

History 

At the beginning, Colón played their home matches at a field, until in March 1938 the land was expropriated due to an unpaid debt so the club was evicted from that place. Because of that, Colón played its home games at the Gimnasia y Esgrima de Ciudadela Stadium and Estadio 15 de Abril. In 1939, C.A. Colón acquired a land to build a new stadium.

After some delays, the stadium was finally inaugurated on 9 July 1946, with a friendly match between Colón and Boca Juniors with an attendance of 10,000.

On December 7, 1947, Eva Perón arrived in Santa Fe to inaugurate the Children's Hospital that bore her name. After that, he visited the Colón stadium and kicked off a classic from Santa Fe, of which the second half could not be completed because she took an hour to arrive due to the busy schedule and the stadium facilities still did not have lighting. On April 2, 1949, the lighting was finally inaugurated during the Colón 5–1 Huracán match, thanks to a subsidy of $150,000 provided by the National Government.

On September 18, 1950, the leaders of Colón managed to acquire a land adjoining the stadium, thanks to a loan of $750,000 granted by the National Government. The land itself was located in its southern sector, which, in the end, was acquired in cash for the sole purpose of continuing with the expansion of the stands. In 1952, the first section of cement on the west side was completed, which included 1,000 stalls. In this way, it increased its capacity to 20,000 people, becoming the one with the largest capacity in Santa Fe.

That same year the stadium was named "Eva Perón" who had supported Colón's affiliation to the Argentine Football Association in 1948. and later financially help the institution for the construction of the first cement grandstands and artificial lighting. However, after the coup d'état that overthrew Juan Domingo Perón, the names of the president and his wife were banned, so the stadium was renamed "Brigadier General Estanislao López" in honor of the Argentine caudillo who governed the province of Santa Fe between 1818 and 1838.

In 2009, the AFA chose the Brigadier López Stadium as one of the venues for the 2011 Copa América hosted in Argentina. That same year, the stadium was refurbished and expanded. Works included new grandstands, scoreboards, press boxes, and a renovated lighting system.

Sports events

Football 
The stadium hosted the following matches of the 2011 Copa América:

Rugby union

Rugby U20 World Cup 
In 2010 the stadium was one of the three venues of the World Rugby U-20 Championship. Some pool A and pool C matches and the playoffs were played at Colón Stadium.

Other rugby matches

Concerts
Estadio Brigadier López has hosted several concerts of Argentine and international bands, such as:

Notes

References

External links

Photos at stadionwelt.de 

Club Atlético Colón
b
b
b
b
Buildings and structures in Santa Fe Province
Sport in Santa Fe Province
Sports venues completed in 1946
Buildings and structures in Santa Fe, Argentina